The men's BMX race competition at the 2010 Asian Games in Guangzhou was held on 19 November at the Guangzhou Velodrome.

Schedule
All times are China Standard Time (UTC+08:00)

Results 
Legend
DNS — Did not start

Qualifying

Heat 1

Heat 2

Final

References

External links 
Results
Results

BMX Men